Khuha Sawan is a khwaeng (subdistrict) of Phasi Charoen District, in Bangkok, Thailand. In 2020, it had a total population of 6,063 people.

Denomination
Its name Khuha Sawan (lit: "celestial cavern") after a local temple, Wat Khuha Sawan, a historic Buddhist temple, formerly known as Wat Sala Si Na (วัดศาลาสี่หน้า).

Geography
It is sort of shaped like a boot with toe not far from the Bang Wa BTS Skytrain and Bang Wa MRT Subway stations. It shares a border with sister subdistrict Pak Khlong Phasi Charoen. Both areas are informally known collectively as "Bang Phai".

Khuha Sawan borders Bang Phrom and Khlong Chak Phra to the north (Khlong Bang Chueak Nang is a borderline), Bang Khun Si and Wat Tha Phra to the east (Khlong Bang Khun Si, Khlong Mon and Khlong Bangkok Yai are the borderlines), Pak Khlong Phasi Charoen to the south (Khlong Bang Chak is a borderline), Bang Chak and Bang Waek to the west.

It has a total area of 0.909 km2 (0.351 sq mi). Regarded as the smallest administrative area of Phasi Charoen District.

Places
Khlong Bang Luang Artist House, also referred to as Bann Silapin
Wat Khuha Sawan
Wat Pak Nam Fang Tai
Wat Wichitkarnnimit (Wat Nang)
Wat Nok
Wat Bang Waek
Wat Bot Ittharasanpetch
Sutham Suksa School and Wat Suwan Khiri (abandoned)
Thonburi Commercial College
Bang Sao Thong Police Station
Sujinwadee School

References

Subdistricts of Bangkok
Phasi Charoen district